The 1988 Portuguese Grand Prix was a Formula One motor race held on 25 September 1988 at the Autódromo do Estoril, Estoril. It was the thirteenth race of the 1988 Formula One World Championship. The 71-lap race was won by Alain Prost, driving a McLaren-Honda, with Ivan Capelli second in a March-Judd and Thierry Boutsen third in a Benetton-Ford. Prost's teammate and Drivers' Championship rival, Ayrton Senna, could only manage sixth.

Qualifying
McLaren gained their 9th front row of the year with Alain Prost in front of Ayrton Senna for the first time since France. Prost, whose MP4/4 had a brand new, stiffer chassis, set his fastest time early in Saturday qualifying, and then sat out the rest of the session, confident that Senna could not better the time. Senna indeed qualified second. They were ahead of Ivan Capelli in the atmospheric March-Judd, with Maurício Gugelmin in fifth behind the Ferrari of Monza winner Gerhard Berger. Both Capelli and Gugelmin expressed delight with their cars, especially in the fast corners.

After finishing third and fourth in Italy, the Arrows-Megatrons of Derek Warwick (10th) and Eddie Cheever (18th) struggled in Portugal. Both drivers complained of little grip on the rarely used Estoril circuit, which was compounded by slow turns which exposed the Straight-4 Megatron engine's lack of throttle response.

After missing the previous two races in Belgium and Italy due to illness, Nigel Mansell was back in his Williams-Judd. He complained of a sore neck but qualified 6th, less than 0.1 behind Gugelmin.

Julian Bailey (Tyrrell-Ford), Stefano Modena (EuroBrun-Ford), and the Zakspeeds of Piercarlo Ghinzani and Bernd Schneider all failed to qualify while Oscar Larrauri (EuroBrun-Ford) failed to pre-qualify.

Race
The first start was aborted when the Rial-Ford of Andrea de Cesaris stalled on the grid. The second start was aborted after Derek Warwick stalled his Arrows A10 and was hit by de Cesaris, with Luis Pérez-Sala (Minardi) and Satoru Nakajima (Lotus). Ayrton Senna led off at the third start, to the delight of the Portuguese crowd. At the start of lap 2, Alain Prost pulled out of Senna's slipstream to pass him. The Frenchman nonetheless maintained his will to pass the Brazilian, not lifting off the throttle, and passed Senna into the first corner.

Prost was not impressed with Senna's tactics and the pair exchanged words in the McLaren camp after the race. Senna countered Prost's anger by stating that he had almost been pushed onto the grass by Prost before the first corner after the start. Prost's lead built up to 7 seconds and would last until the flag, while Senna was being troubled by an erratic (and ultimately false) fuel readout which was telling him he was using too much. This allowed Capelli to close right up on him. On lap 22 the Italian out-braked Senna to excited acclaim and opened up a gap on him. It was the first time all season other than when Prost suffered from severe misfires at both the British and Italian GP's that a McLaren-Honda had been passed on track by any other car. Soon after Gerhard Berger also passed the McLaren, leaving Senna exposed to the attacks of Nigel Mansell's Williams. The Briton was closer on the corners, but the Honda turbo was superior in the fast sectors of the track.

Berger had claimed the fastest lap in his pursuit of Capelli, but spun off on lap 36. He had accidentally set off his fire extinguisher, with the resultant freezing of his leg with carbon dioxide causing his foot to slip off the pedals. Berger had been attempting a cockpit adjustment to his car but on the bumpy Estoril surface simply hit the wrong button. On lap 55, Mansell and Senna attempted to lap the Tyrrell of Jonathan Palmer: during this manoeuvre Mansell hit the back off the McLaren and spun into the barriers though without any damage to Senna who continued on. Maurício Gugelmin, Nelson Piquet (Lotus-Honda), Michele Alboreto (Ferrari), Riccardo Patrese (Williams-Judd) and Thierry Boutsen (Benetton-Ford) were hotly contesting the last point place in 6th. On lap 29 Patrese retired with a split radiator and the next lap Piquet retired with clutch and gearbox problems. On lap 57, Senna, still having problems with his fuel readout, pitted for a tyre change and was passed by Alboreto, Boutsen and Derek Warwick, falling to 6th.

Prost won from Capelli, who at one stage was catching the McLaren, but backed off to save his engine after seeing his teammate's car sitting beside the track with a dead engine; the gap at the line was 9.5 seconds and Prost himself was marginal on fuel. It was Capelli's first podium finish in Formula One and the first time a March had finished on the podium of a Grand Prix since the 1976 Italian Grand Prix. Fuel problems were a feature of this race: on the last corner of the race Alboreto's engine stuttered-his car was running out of fuel despite the gauge indicating he had plenty left. Boutsen passed him to get his 5th podium of the year and Warwick claimed 4th place. The dry Ferrari of Alboreto and McLaren of Senna were classified 5th and 6th.

Prost's 5th win of the year, and his first since France, along with Senna's 6th place, saw him remain in strong contention for his third World Championship.

Classification

Pre-qualifying

Qualifying

Race

Championship standings after the race
Bold Text indicates World Champions.

Drivers' Championship standings

Constructors' Championship standings

 Only the top five positions are included for both sets of standings. Points accurate at final declaration of results. The Benettons were subsequently disqualified from the Belgian Grand Prix and their points reallocated.

References

Portuguese Grand Prix
Portuguese Grand Prix
Portuguese Grand Prix
Portuguese Grand Prix